In differential geometry, a Riemannian manifold or Riemannian space , so called after the German mathematician Bernhard Riemann, is a real, smooth manifold M equipped with a positive-definite inner product gp on the tangent space TpM at each point p. 

The family gp of inner products is called a Riemannian metric (or Riemannian metric tensor). Riemannian geometry is the study of Riemannian manifolds.

A common convention is to take g to be smooth, which means that for any smooth coordinate chart  on M, the n2 functions

are smooth functions.

A Riemannian metric (tensor) makes it possible to define several geometric notions on a Riemannian manifold, such as angle at an intersection, length of a curve, area of a surface and higher-dimensional analogues (volume, etc.), extrinsic curvature of submanifolds, and intrinsic curvature of the manifold itself.

Introduction
In 1828, Carl Friedrich Gauss proved his Theorema Egregium ("remarkable theorem" in Latin), establishing an important property of surfaces. Informally, the theorem says that the curvature of a surface can be determined entirely by measuring distances along paths on the surface. That is, curvature does not depend on how the surface might be embedded in 3-dimensional space. See Differential geometry of surfaces. Bernhard Riemann extended Gauss's theory to higher-dimensional spaces called manifolds in a way that also allows distances and angles to be measured and the notion of curvature to be defined, again in a way that is intrinsic to the manifold and not dependent upon its embedding in higher-dimensional spaces. Albert Einstein used the theory of pseudo-Riemannian manifolds (a generalization of Riemannian manifolds) to develop his general theory of relativity. In particular, his equations for gravitation are constraints on the curvature of spacetime.

Definition 

When given a system of smooth local coordinates on  given by  real-valued functions  the vectors

form a basis of the vector space  for any  Relative to this basis, one can define metric tensor "components" at each point  by

One could consider these as  individual functions  or as a single  matrix-valued function on  note that the "Riemannian" assumption says that it is valued in the subset consisting of symmetric positive-definite matrices.

In terms of tensor algebra, the metric tensor can be written in terms of the dual basis  of the cotangent bundle as

Isometries 
 
for all  and 

One says that a map  not assumed to be a diffeomorphism, is a local isometry if every  has an open neighborhood  such that  is an isometry (and thus a diffeomorphism).

Regularity of a Riemannian metric 
One says that the Riemannian metric  is continuous if  are continuous when given any smooth coordinate chart  One says that  is smooth if these functions are smooth when given any smooth coordinate chart. One could also consider many other types of Riemannian metrics in this spirit.

In most expository accounts of Riemannian geometry, the metrics are always taken to be smooth. However, there can be important reasons to consider metrics which are less smooth. Riemannian metrics produced by methods of geometric analysis, in particular, can be less than smooth. See for instance (Gromov 1999) and (Shi and Tam 2002).

Overview 
Examples of Riemannian manifolds will be discussed below. In this sense, it is arguable that nothing can be gained from the consideration of abstract smooth manifolds and their Riemannian metrics. However, there are many natural smooth Riemannian manifolds, such as the set of rotations of three-dimensional space and the hyperbolic space, of which any representation as a submanifold of Euclidean space will fail to represent their remarkable symmetries and properties as clearly as their abstract presentations do.

Examples

Euclidean space 
Let  denote the standard coordinates on  Then define  by
 
Phrased differently: relative to the standard coordinates, the local representation  is given by the constant value 

This is clearly a Riemannian metric, and is called the standard Riemannian structure on  It is also referred to as Euclidean space of dimension n and gijcan is also called the (canonical) Euclidean metric.

Embedded submanifolds 

 For example, consider  which is a smooth embedded submanifold of the Euclidean space with its standard metric.
 There are many similar examples. For example, every ellipsoid in  has a natural Riemannian metric. The graph of a smooth function  is an embedded submanifold, and so has a natural Riemannian metric as well.

Immersions 
Let  be a Riemannian manifold and let  be a differentiable map. Then one may consider the pullback of  via , which is a symmetric 2-tensor on  defined by
 

In this setting, generally  will not be a Riemannian metric on  since it is not positive-definite. For instance, if  is constant, then  is zero. In fact,  is a Riemannian metric if and only if  is an immersion, meaning that the linear map  is injective for each 
 An important example occurs when  is not simply-connected, so that there is a covering map  This is an immersion, and so the universal cover of any Riemannian manifold automatically inherits a Riemannian metric. More generally, but by the same principle, any covering space of a Riemannian manifold inherits a Riemannian metric.
 Also, an immersed submanifold of a Riemannian manifold inherits a Riemannian metric.

Product metrics 
Let  and  be two Riemannian manifolds, and consider the cartesian product  with the usual product smooth structure.
 Considering the decomposition  one may define
 
 

A standard example is to consider the n-torus  define as the n-fold product  If one gives each copy of  its standard Riemannian metric, considering  as an embedded submanifold (as above), then one can consider the product Riemannian metric on  It is called a flat torus.

Convex combinations of metrics 
Let  and  be two Riemannian metrics on  Then, for any number 

Every smooth manifold has a Riemannian metric 
This is a fundamental result. Although much of the basic theory of Riemannian metrics can be developed by only using that a smooth manifold is locally Euclidean, for this result it is necessary to include in the definition of "smooth manifold" that it is Hausdorff and paracompact. The reason is that the proof makes use of a partition of unity.

The metric space structure of continuous connected Riemannian manifolds

The length of piecewise continuously-differentiable curves 
If  is differentiable, then it assigns to each  a vector  in the vector space  the size of which can be measured by the norm  So  defines a nonnegative function on the interval  The length is defined as the integral of this function; however, as presented here, there is no reason to expect this function to be integrable.
 
is well-defined. This definition can easily be extended to define the length of any piecewise-continuously differentiable curve.

In many instances, such as in defining the Riemann curvature tensor, it is necessary to require that g has more regularity than mere continuity; this will be discussed elsewhere. For now, continuity of g will be enough to use the length defined above in order to endow M with the structure of a metric space, provided that it is connected.

The metric space structure 
Precisely, define  by

It is mostly straightforward to check the well-definedness of the function  its symmetry property  its reflexivity property  and the triangle inequality  although there are some minor technical complications (such as verifying that any two points can be connected by a piecewise-differentiable path). It is more fundamental to understand that  ensures  and hence that  satisfies all of the axioms of a metric.

The observation that underlies the above proof, about comparison between lengths measured by g and Euclidean lengths measured in a smooth coordinate chart, also verifies that the metric space topology of  coincides with the original topological space structure of 

Although the length of a curve is given by an explicit formula, it is generally impossible to write out the distance function  by any explicit means. In fact, if  is compact then, even when g is smooth, there always exist points where  is non-differentiable, and it can be remarkably difficult to even determine the location or nature of these points, even in seemingly simple cases such as when  is an ellipsoid.

Geodesics 
As in the previous section, let  be a connected and continuous Riemannian manifold; consider the associated metric space  Relative to this metric space structure, one says that a path  is a unit-speed geodesic if for every  there exists an interval  which contains  and such that
 
The fact that we are only looking for curves to locally stretch themselves out is reflected by the first two examples given below; the global shape of  may force even the most innocuous geodesics to bend back and intersect themselves.
This example also exhibits the necessity of selecting out the subinterval  since the curve  repeats back on itself in a particularly natural way.
 Likewise, if  is the round sphere  with its standard Riemannian metric, then a unit-speed path along an equatorial circle will be a geodesic. A unit-speed path along the other latitudinal circles will not be geodesic.
Note that unit-speed geodesics, as defined here, are by necessity continuous, and in fact Lipschitz, but they are not necessarily differentiable or piecewise differentiable.

The Hopf–Rinow theorem 
As above, let  be a connected and continuous Riemannian manifold. The Hopf–Rinow theorem, in this setting, says that (Gromov 1999)
 if the metric space  is complete (i.e. every -Cauchy sequence converges) then

For example, consider the case that  is the punctured plane  with its standard Riemannian metric, and one takes  and  There is no unit-speed geodesic from one to the other.

The diameter 
Let  be a connected and continuous Riemannian manifold.
 
The Hopf–Rinow theorem shows that if  is complete and has finite diameter, then it is compact. Conversely, if  is compact, then the function  has a maximum, since it is a continuous function on a compact metric space. This proves the following statement:
 If  is complete, then it is compact if and only if it has finite diameter.
This is not the case without the completeness assumption; for counterexamples one could consider any open bounded subset of a Euclidean space with the standard Riemannian metric.

Note that, more generally, and with the same one-line proof, every compact metric space has finite diameter. However the following statement is false: "If a metric space is complete and has finite diameter, then it is compact." For an example of a complete and non-compact metric space of finite diameter, consider
 
with the uniform metric
 
So, although all of the terms in the above corollary of the Hopf–Rinow theorem involve only the metric space structure of  it is important that the metric is induced from a Riemannian structure.

Riemannian metrics

Geodesic completeness 
A Riemannian manifold M is geodesically complete if for all , the exponential map expp is defined for all , i.e. if any geodesic γ(t) starting from p is defined for all values of the parameter .  The Hopf–Rinow theorem asserts that M is geodesically complete if and only if it is complete as a metric space.

If M is complete, then M is non-extendable in the sense that it is not isometric to an open proper submanifold of any other Riemannian manifold.  The converse is not true, however: there exist non-extendable manifolds that are not complete.

Infinite-dimensional manifolds 
The statements and theorems above are for finite-dimensional manifolds—manifolds whose charts map to open subsets of  These can be extended, to a certain degree, to infinite-dimensional manifolds; that is, manifolds that are modeled after a topological vector space; for example, Fréchet, Banach and Hilbert manifolds.

Definitions 
Riemannian metrics are defined in a way similar to the finite-dimensional case. However there is a distinction between two types of Riemannian metrics:

Examples 
 If  is a Hilbert space, then for any  one can identify  with  By setting for all   one obtains a strong Riemannian metric.
 Let  be a compact Riemannian manifold and denote by  its diffeomorphism group. It is a smooth manifold (see here) and in fact, a Lie group.

The metric space structure 
Length of curves is defined in a way similar to the finite-dimensional case. The function  is defined in the same manner and is called the geodesic distance. In the finite-dimensional case, the proof that this function is a metric uses the existence of a pre-compact open set around any point. In the infinite case, open sets are no longer pre-compact and so this statement may fail.
 If  is a weak Riemannian metric but not strong,  may fail to separate points or even be degenerate.
For an example of the latter, see Valentino and Daniele (2019).

The Hopf–Rinow theorem 
In the case of strong Riemannian metrics, a part of the finite-dimensional Hopf–Rinow still works. 

Theorem: Let  be a strong Riemannian manifold. Then metric completeness (in the metric ) implies geodesic completeness (geodesics exist for all time). Proof can be found in (Lang 1999, Chapter VII, Section 6). The other statements of the finite-dimensional case may fail.
An example can be found here.

If  is a weak Riemannian metric, then no notion of completeness implies the other in general.

See also 

 Riemannian geometry
 Finsler manifold
 Sub-Riemannian manifold
 Pseudo-Riemannian manifold
 Metric tensor
 Hermitian manifold
 Space (mathematics)
 Wave maps equation

References

External links
 

Riemannian geometry